My Point of View is the ninth album by American jazz saxophonist and flautist, Najee. This album was released through Heads Up International in 2005. Jonathan Widran of AllMusic writes that "it's a good bet that this very likeable set will once again bring Najee to the forefront of the genre." Woodrow Wilkins of All About Jazz states in his review that "Najee delivers a pleasant collection of danceable and romantic grooves."

Critical reception

Jonathan Widran of AllMusic writes, "Even with all the new sax players that have arisen on the scene since his albums were routinely selling gold, it's a good bet that this very likeable set will once again bring Najee to the forefront of the genre."

Woodrow Wilkins of All About Jazz says in his review, "Najee delivers a pleasant collection of danceable and romantic grooves." and concludes with "If you're not bothered by synthesized drums, you'll love this album. If, on the other hand, programming turns you off, you might want to skip it. My Point of View is nice, but it would have been much better if the artist had expressed himself free from the corporate forces that favor synths over instruments."

Smooth Jazz Therapy'''s review says, "My Point Of View'' is smooth jazz very much in the mid tempo laid back style that Najee has made his own. It’s a collection for grown ups that is controlled, never off the chain but always soulful sensuous and moving. The ten-track set exudes quality throughout and features a number of notable collaborations especially those in which Chris 'Mad Dog' Davies plays a part."

Track listing

All track information and credits were taken from the CD liner notes.

References

External links
Najee Official Site
Heads Up International Official Site

2005 albums
Najee albums
Heads Up International albums